Penicillium severskii is a species of fungus in the genus Penicillium.

References 

severskii
Fungi described in 1981